Kon Khon is a 2011 Thai film by Sarunyoo Wongkrachang. It concerns a love triangle involving three rival Khon dancers The film was selected as the Thai entry for the Best Foreign Language Film at the 84th Academy Awards, but it did not make the final shortlist.

Plot
An orphan, Chart, raised by his master after his parents' death and trained be to be a Khon dancer, becomes involved with the dance teacher Rambai.

Cast
Apinya Rungpitakmana as Chart
Gongtun Pongpatna as Tue
Nantarat Chaowarat as Ram
Pimolrat Pisolyabutr as Rambai
Nirut Sirijanya
Sorapong Chatree
Penpak Sirikul

See also
 List of submissions to the 84th Academy Awards for Best Foreign Language Film
 List of Thai submissions for the Academy Award for Best Foreign Language Film

References

External links
 
Kon Khon at EnjoyThaiMovies
Kon Khon Review

2011 films
2011 romantic drama films
Thai romantic drama films
Thai-language films